Shaykh Uways Jalayir was the Jalayirid ruler of Iraq (1356–1374) and Azerbaijan (1360–1374). He was the son of Hasan Buzurg and the Chobanid princess Dilshad Khatun.

Rise to throne 
Shortly after Shaykh Uways Jalayir succeeded his father, the old enemy of the Jalayirids, the Chobanids, were overrun by the forces of the Golden Horde under Jani Beg in 1357. Malek Asraf was executed, and Azerbaijan was conquered. Following Jani Beg's withdrawal from Azerbaijan, as well as his son Berdi Beg's similar abandonment of the region in 1358, the area became a prime target for its neighbors. Shaykh Uways Jalayir, who at first had recognized the sovereignty of the Blue Horde, decided to take the former Chobanid lands for himself, even as a former amir of Malek Asraf's named Akhi Juq attempted to keep the region in Mongol hands. 

Uvais conquered the area in August 1358, following a swift victory over remnants of Chobanids in a battle near Sitay mountain. In addition to Baghdad, he could now boast Tabriz as a large city under his control. He had certain problems with Genoese who tried to build a stronghold city's vicinity, which caused Genoa to boycott the region.

Unlike his predecessors who only claimed to be emirs of figurehead ilkhans, Shaykh Uways claimed regal titles like sultan, khan and even ilkhan.

Moving on, he sent his emir Ali Piltan towards Nakhchivan, where Akhi Juq was hiding. However, he was disastrously defeated on 28 January 1359, Uways had to retreat to Baghdad and lost Tabriz to Akhi Juq temporarily. Same year Muzaffarids conquered Tabriz and Mubariz al-Din Muhammad became new ruler of the region, as well as a new rival. However this rivalry cut short when the latter was blinded and imprisoned by his own son Shah Shuja. Uways was now master of Azerbaijan once again. Although Temürtas once campaigned to regain Chupanid territories, he was turned over to Uways by Khizrshah of Ahlat (d. 1384) to be executed in 1360.

Consolidation of rule 

During his reign, Shaykh Uways Jalayir sought to increase his holdings in Iran. He became involved in the power struggles of the Muzaffarids, supporting Shah Mahmud in his efforts against his brother Shah Shuja. Shah Mahmud received support around 1363 in his conquest of Shiraz and later his son married one of Shaykh Uways Jalayir's daughters in 1369/70.

In 1364, Shaykh Uways Jalayir campaigned against the Shirvanshah Kavus, but a revolt begun by the governor of Baghdad, Khwaja Mirjan, forced him to return to reassert his authority. The revolt was supported by Al-Ashraf Sha'ban of Mamluks. Although Uways managed to defeat Khwaja, he was pardoned in the end. He was reinstated as governer eventually in 1367 until his death in 1374.

In 1366, Shaykh Uways Jalayir marched against the Black Sheep Turkmen, defeating their leader Birdi Khwaja in Mosul and his brother Bayram Khwaja, at the battle of Mush. Later, he turned his attention toward Shirvanshah Kavus again who had attacked Tabriz twice in the meantime. His emir Bayram Beg besieged Shamakhi for 3 months after which Kavus was jailed for another 3 months. He was pardoned and accepted to become Jalayirid vassal with his son Hushang being Uways' hostage until 1372. 

In 1367, his brother Amir Qasim died of consumption, while his favorite general Bayram Beg who subdued Shirvan also died of excessive drinking. Following year Uways also lost his wife Haji Mama Khatun.

End of reign 
He tried to establish relations with Republic of Venice in 1369 unsuccessfully. In an effort to extend further east, he fought against Amir Vali, who ruled in Astarabad, and defeated him in Ray in 1371. When his brother Amir Zahid died in Ujan after falling off the palace roof, however, he was forced to turn back. The governorship of Ray was trusted in the hands of a Qutlugh Shah, who was followed two years later by ‘Adil Aqa.

Due to his campaigns, Shaykh Uways Jalayir spent much time in Iran, and he died in Tabriz on 10 October 1374; Baghdad, however, remained his capital. During his lifetime, the Jalayirid state reached its peak in power. In addition to his military adventures, which were considerable, he was known for his attempts to revive commercial enterprise, which had suffered heavily in the past years, in the region, as well as his patronage to the arts. His chronicler, Abu Bakr al-Qutbi al Ahri, wrote of Shaykh Uways Jalayir’ deeds in the Tarikh-i Shaikh Uvais. 

Shaykh Uways Jalayir was succeeded by his son Shaikh Hasan Jalayir, however he was immediately assassinated on same day.

Children
He was married to Haji Mama Khatun (d. 1368) with whom he had several children:
Shaikh Hasan Jalayir (k. October 9, 1374) — married to a daughter of Qadi Shaykh Ali, leading ulama of Tabriz.
Shaikh Ali Jalayir — Governor of Baghdad
Shah Walad Jalayir
Sultan Mahmud Jalayir
Sultan Awais Jalayir
Sultan Muhammad Jalayir
Shaikh Hussain Jalayir (k. 1382 ) — succeeded as sultan in 1374
Shaikh Bayazid Jalayir — ruler in Sultaniyeh
Sultan Ahmed Jalayir (d. 1410) — Governor of Ardabil, succeeded Hussain
Ala-du-Daulah Jalayir
Hussain bin Ala-ud-Daulah Jalayir
Tandu Khatun (Disputed)

Ancestry

References

Sources

Further reading
 
 

1374 deaths
Year of birth unknown
Jalayirids
14th-century monarchs in Asia
Calligraphers from Tabriz